War Department Technical Manual TM-E 30-480 Handbook On Japanese Military Forces dated 15 September 1944 was the US Army's guide to the Japanese armed forces for the use of troops in the field. The "E" stands for "enemy."

It was 8" × 10½", bound in two removable olive pasteboard covers to facilitate the addition and deletion of material. It was originally 401pp., with 412 illustrations including diagrams, photos, charts. color plates of uniforms & medals. It detailed most of the known information about the Imperial Japanese Military as of the publication date. It superseded the original TM E 30-480 dated 14 May 1941 and the second edition dated 21 September 1942. The handbook was classified "Restricted" (the lowest of the four wartime security classifications) to enable its dissemination to the widest possible audience.

Readers should take care when consulting TM-E 30-480 as there are many inaccuracies shown by post war research. It is a wartime publication subject to the limitations of wartime intelligence collection and dissemination.

TM-E 30-480 has been reprinted several times by several different publishers. The 1995 edition includes an Introduction by David Isby and an afterword by Jeffrey Ethell,  Louisiana State University Press, Baton Rouge Louisiana 70803, 403 pp., illus, in colour and b/w, maps, wraps. None of these editions is complete.

Contents
CHAPTER I. RECRUITMENT AND TRAINING.
Section I. General 	
Section II. Conscription system 	
Section III. Procurement of officers 	
Section IV. Training 	
Section V. Promotion, pay and awards 	
Section VI. Morale, discipline, and efficiency 	
 
CHAPTER II. JAPANESE MILITARY SYSTEM.
 Section I. The Japanese High Command 	
 Section II. Territorial organizations, including depot divisions 	
 Section III. Field replacement system 	
 
CHAPTER III. FIELD ORGANIZATION.
 Section I. Major organizations 	
 Section II. Arms (nondivisional) 	
 Section III. Services (nondivisional) 	
 Section IV. Military Intelligence 	
 Section V. Reorganization 	

CHAPTER IV. JAPANESE AIR SERVICE.
Section I. General 	
Section II. Organization of the Japanese Army Air Service 	
Section III. Strategic doctrine 	
Section IV. Japanese air tactics 	
Section V. Equipment 	
 
CHAPTER V. Special Forces.
 Section I. Naval land forces
 Section II. 	Task forces and special defense units 	

CHAPTER VI. JAPANESE MILITARY POLICE.
 Section I. Administration
 Section II. Recruiting
 Section III. Uniform and Equipment
 Section IV. Strength
 Section V. Units
 SectionVI. Distribution According to Areas
 SectionVII. Military Police Dutied in the Field
 SectionVIII. Morale and Value for War of the Military Police

CHAPTER VII. TACTICS OF THE JAPANESE ARMY.
PART I. General tactical doctrine 	
 Section I. General 	
 Section II. Offensive 	
 Section III. Defensive 	
 Section IV. Retrograde movements 	
 Section V. Employment of tanks and mechanized units 	
 PART II. Application of tactics 	
 Section VI. Antiaircraft 	
 Section VII. Antitank defense 	
 Section VIII. Jungle warfare 	
 Section IX. Small island defense 	
 Section X. Coastal defense 	
 Section XI. Japanese joint operations 	
 Section XII. Japanese parachute troops 	
 
CHAPTER VIII. SUPPLY, MOVEMENTS, AND EVACUATION.
 Section I. Supply
 Section II. Movements 	
 Section III. Evacuation 	
 
CHAPTER IX. WEAPONS.
 Section I. Introduction 	
 Section II. Infantry weapons 	
 Section III. Artillery 	
 Section IV. Tanks and armored cars
 Section V. Chemical warfare 	
 
CHAPTER X. EQUIPMENT.
 Section I. Introduction 	
 Section II. Infantry equipment 	
 Section III. Artillery equipment 	
 Section IV. Signal equipment 	
 Section V. Engineer equipment 	
 Section VI. Cavalry and reconnaissance
 Section VII. Automotive and land transport equipment
 Section VIII. Tentage
 Section IX. Medical equipment
 
CHAPTER XI. UNIFORMS, PERSONAL EQUIPMENT, AND INSIGNIA 
 Section I. Standard Uniforms
 Section II. Uniforms for Special Arms
 Section III. Special cold and hot weather clothing
 Section IV. Individual equipment
 Section V. Insignia, Decorations, and Awards

CHAPTER XII. CONVENTIONAL SIGNS AND ABBREVIATIONS
 Section I. Introduction
 Section II. Geographic signs
 Section III. Military signs
 Section IV. Military abbreviations 	
 
CHAPTER XIII. MILITARY TERMS AND CHARACTERS 
 Section I. Japanese Year Dates
 Section II. Japanese Weights, Measures, and Moneys
 Section III. Method of Numbering Models	
 
APPENDIX SUPPLEMENTAL DATA

Changes
TM E 30-480 Handbook on Japanese Military Forces had five Changes which were as follows:
 Change 1: Japanese Airforces (1 January 1945); 39 pages,
 Change 3: Field Organization (1 June 1945); 94 pages,
 Change 4: Japanese Fortifications (1 July 1945); 68 pages,
 Change 5: Naval Ground Units (1 July 1945); 11 pages,
 Change 6: Weapons (15 September 1945); 228 pages,
 Change 7: Japanese Military Police (15 August 1945);

References
 TM-E 30-480 Handbook On Japanese Military Forces, 15 September 1944 (with printed changes 1 through 7)

External links

 Manual online at ibiblio.org
 link at encyclopedia.com

Imperial Japanese Army
1944 non-fiction books
Military handbooks and manuals